Tim Brown (born October 25, 1962) is an American politician who has served as the President of the Toledo Metropolitan Area Council of Governments since 2016. He previously served in the Ohio House of Representatives, representing the 3rd District from 2013 to 2016.

Life and career
Brown received a bachelor's degree in business from Bowling Green State University in 1986. He formerly served as a Wood County Commissioner and as a district representative for United States Congressman Paul Gillmor. In 2013, Brown completed Harvard University's John F. Kennedy School of Government program for Senior Executives in State and Local Government as a David Bohnett Foundation LGBTQ Victory Institute Leadership Fellow.

Ohio House of Representatives
A member of the Ohio Republican Party, Brown represents the 3rd District. He won his first term in 2012 to succeed Randy Gardner by defeating Democrat Kelly Wicks and Libertarian Nathan Eberly with 51% of the vote.

Brown is the first openly gay man to serve in the Ohio state legislature, and only the second LGBT person following Nickie Antonio.  He will also be one of just two openly gay Republican state legislators in the United States, alongside Pennsylvania state representative Mike Fleck.

Electoral history

References

1962 births
Living people
County commissioners in Ohio
Gay politicians
LGBT Christians
LGBT state legislators in Ohio
Republican Party members of the Ohio House of Representatives
People from Bowling Green, Ohio
Politicians from Omaha, Nebraska
21st-century American politicians